The 1998 Copa Perú season, the promotion tournament of Peruvian football.

The tournament has 5 stages. The first four stages are played as mini-league round-robin tournaments, except for third stage in region IV, which is played as a knockout stage. The final stage features two knockout rounds and a final four-team group stage to determine the two promoted teams.

The 1998 Peru Cup started with the District Stage on February. The next stage was the Provincial Stage which started, on June. The tournament continued with the Departmental Stage on July. The Regional Staged followed. The National Stage started on November. The winner and runner-up of the National Stage will be promoted to the First Division.

Departmental Stage
The following list shows the teams that qualified for the Regional Stage.

Regional Stage
The following list shows the teams that qualified for the Regional Stage.

Region I
Region I includes qualified teams from Amazonas, Lambayeque, Tumbes and Piura region.

Group A

Playoff

Group B

Final Group

Playoff

Region II
Region II includes qualified teams from Ancash, Cajamarca and La Libertad region.

Playoff

Region III
Region III includes qualified teams from Loreto, San Martín and Ucayali region.

Playoff

Region IV
Region IV includes qualified teams from Callao, Ica and Lima region.

Playoff

Region V
Region V includes qualified teams from Huánuco, Junín and Pasco region.

Note: Originally Señor de Puelles (8 pts) won the group. But after a complaint by Hidro, this team received 3 pts from its match against Señor de Puelles, hence obtaining first place.

Region VI
Region VI includes qualified teams from Apurímac, Ayacucho and Huancavelica region.

Playoff

Region VII
Region VII includes qualified teams from Cusco, Madre de Dios and Puno region.

Playoff

Region VIII
Region VIII includes qualified teams from Arequipa, Moquegua and Tacna region.

Note: Because both teams were already eliminated, Senati and Peñarol agreed to not play their match.

National Stage
The National Stage started in November. The winners of the National Stage will be promoted to the First Division.

Quarterfinals

Semifinals

Finals

External links
  Copa Peru 1998

Copa Perú seasons
Cop